Tanya Gold (born 31 December 1973) is an English freelance journalist.

Career
Gold has written for British newspapers, including The New York Times The Guardian, the Daily Mail, The Independent, The Daily Telegraph, The Sunday Times, the Evening Standard, New Statesman and for The Spectator magazine.

In 2009, she was commended in the Feature Writer of the Year category at the British Press Awards. In 2010, she won Feature Writer of the Year at the British Press Awards and was also nominated for Columnist of the Year.

Gold is an avowed republican.

References

External links

1973 births
Living people
People from the London Borough of Merton
English Jews
Alumni of Merton College, Oxford
People educated at Kingston Grammar School
English women journalists
The Guardian journalists
The Spectator people
21st-century British journalists
21st-century English women writers